CCPLS may refer to:

 Cobb County Public Library System in Cobb County, Georgia
 Cullman County Public Library System in Cullman County, Alabama
 Campbell County Public Library System in Campbell County, Wyoming